Mercatale may refer to:

 Mercatale, an Italian village situated in the municipality of Vinci
 Mercatale di Vernio, an Italian village situated in the municipality of Vernio
 Mercatale in Val di Pesa, an Italian village situated in the municipality of San Casciano in Val di Pesa